Alfredo Tena Garduño (born 21 November 1956), also known by his nickname Capitán Furia ("Captain Fury"), is a Mexican former professional footballer and the current youth academy director for Club América. A defender who mainly played as a center back, Tena captained América for several years, and played for his national team during the greater part of his career.

His brother, Luis Fernando, is also a manager and former footballer. He is also the father of footballer Alfredo Omar.

Playing career
Tena debuted with Club América during the 1973–74 season, in a game against rivals Cruz Azul, after coming up through the club's youth system. Soon after, Tena secured a regular spot in the Águilas backfield. During his career at Club América, Tena won numerous titles. During the 1980s, América won six league titles, as well as the Mexican League Champions' Cup trophies after the 1987–88 and 1988–89 seasons, and achieving international success as well with by winning three CONCACAF Champions' Cup titles in 1978, 1987, and 1991 and two Copa Interamericana cups in 1978 and 1991.

Tena was known for his skill and tough marking skills, as well as his sometimes gruff attitude with both opposing players and teammates, a trait that earned him the "Captain Fury" moniker.

In July 1991, Tena announced the end of his career with América, saying: "I have faithfully served this team for so long, all I can say is thank you all for the years of playoffs, championship titles, team mates and all the memories we have made".

Tena would go off to play for Tecos UAG for the 1991–1992 season, before retiring officially from professional football in 1992.

Coaching career
Shortly after his retirement, Tena decided to pursue success from the bench, as a coach. In 1996, he took a job at Santos Laguna, leading them to a title during the Invierno 1996 season. Tena remained at the helm of the Torreón based club until his dismissal in 1998, never being able to duplicate the success of his lone title two years prior. After short stints coaching Puebla and his former team Club América, Tena once again experienced success at the head of Pachuca, winning the league after the Invierno 2001 season. After leaving Pachuca in 2003, he returned to Club América, this time as an assistant to his brother Luis Fernando.

In 2011, Tena was named interim-manager of América, replacing Carlos Reinoso. He was dismissed after a calamitous campaign and was replaced by Miguel Herrera. In 2012, he was named as assistant manager to Javier Aguirre at La Liga club Espanyol.

Honours

Player
América
Primera División: 1975–76, 1983–84, 1984–85, Prode 85, 1987–88, 1988–89
Campeón de Campeones: 1976, 1988, 1989
CONCACAF Champions' Cup: 1978, 1987, 1990
Copa Interamericana: 1977, 1990

Mexico
CONCACAF Championship: 1977

Manager
Santos Laguna
Primera División: Invierno 1996

Pachuca
Primera División: Invierno 2001
CONCACAF Champions' Cup: 2002

References

External links 

 * Stats as a head coach

1956 births
Footballers from Mexico City
Club América footballers
Mexican football managers
Santos Laguna managers
Club Puebla managers
Club América managers
C.F. Pachuca managers
C.D. Veracruz managers
Querétaro F.C. managers
Living people
1978 FIFA World Cup players
Mexico international footballers
Association football defenders
Mexican footballers